Gowhar Chaqa (also Romanized as Gowhar Chaqā, Gowhar Cheqā, and Gowhar Choqā; also known as Gawān Chia, Gowhad Cheqā, Gowhar Cheghā, and Gūn Chīā) is a village in Miyan Darband Rural District, in the Central District of Kermanshah County, Kermanshah Province, Iran. At the 2006 census, its population was 270, in 61 families.

References 

Populated places in Kermanshah County